M27, M.27 or M-27 may refer to:

In science
 Messier 27, a planetary nebula also called the Dumbbell Nebula

In firearms and military equipment
 M27 Mosin–Nagant, a Finnish rifle
 M27 Infantry Automatic Rifle, a squad automatic weapon developed for the U.S. Marine Corps
 M27 link, a disintegrating 5.56×45mm NATO bullet link used in belt fed firearms
 M.27 (mountain gun), a Norwegian mountain gun used in World War II
 M27 tank, a rejected US World War II medium tank design

In transportation
 M27 motorway, a road connecting Cadnam and Portsmouth in Hampshire
 M27 highway (Russia), a road connecting  Novorossiysk and the border with Georgia
 M-27 (Michigan highway), a road connecting I-75 near Indian River and US 23 and C-66 in Cheboygan 
 Manitoba Highway 27, a road connecting PTH 8 (McPhillips Rd.) and PTH 9 (Main St.)
 M27 (Johannesburg), a Metropolitan Route in Johannesburg, South Africa
 M27 (Pretoria), a Metropolitan Route in Pretoria, South Africa
 M27 (Durban), a Metropolitan Route in Durban, South Africa